Yahya Kalley (born 20 March 2001) is a Swedish professional footballer who plays for Allsvenskan club IFK Norrköping as a left-back, on loan from Dutch club Groningen.

International career
Born in Sweden, Kalley is of Gambian descent. He is a youth international for Sweden.

References

External links 
 

2001 births
Living people
People from Malmö Municipality
Swedish people of Gambian descent
Swedish footballers
Association football fullbacks
Sweden youth international footballers
IFK Göteborg players
FC Groningen players
Allsvenskan players
Eredivisie players
Swedish expatriate footballers
Expatriate footballers in the Netherlands
Swedish expatriate sportspeople in the Netherlands
Footballers from Skåne County
21st-century Swedish people